Asado rolls, also called asado buns or baked siopao, is a Filipino bread roll filled with savory-sweet pork asado. It is similar to the asado siopao except it is baked (not steamed) and uses all-purpose flour instead of rice flour. The top can either be covered with an egg wash, bread crumbs, or sprinkled with sesame seeds.

See also
Pan de coco

References 

Breads
Philippine breads
Southeast Asian breads